Clelia Tini (born 2 January 1992) is a Sammarinese swimmer who competed in the 2012 Summer Olympics. She did not advance to the semifinals.

References 

Sammarinese female swimmers
1992 births
Living people
Swimmers at the 2012 Summer Olympics
Olympic swimmers of San Marino